S.P. Cailungo is a Sanmarinese football club, based in Cailungo, a civil parish of Borgo Maggiore. The club was founded in 1974. Cailungo currently plays in Girone A of Campionato Sammarinese di Calcio. The team's colors are red and green.

Achievements
San Marino Federal Trophy: 1
 2002

Current squad

External links
 FSGC page
eufo.de – Team Squad

 
Association football clubs established in 1974
Football clubs in San Marino
Former Italian football clubs
1974 establishments in San Marino
Borgo Maggiore